Vaxholm is a locality and the seat of Vaxholm Municipality, Stockholm County, Sweden. The name Vaxholm comes from Vaxholm Castle, which was constructed in 1549 on an islet with this name on the inlet to Stockholm, for defence purposes, by King Gustav Vasa.

For historical reasons it has always been referred to as a city, despite the small number of inhabitants, which as of 2010 total was 4,857. Vaxholm Municipality prefers to use the designation Vaxholms stad (City of Vaxholm) for its whole territory, including 64 islets in the Stockholm archipelago, a usage which is somewhat confusing.

History

The town of Vaxholm was established in 1558, when King Gustav Vasa bought some farms from Count Per Brahe the Elder. It later received rights as a merchant town (köping) and in 1652 was granted the Royal Charter. The designated coat of arms reminds of the fortifications as well as shipping industry.

During the 19th century, it hardly expanded. In the 1880s, it became a popular spa town, and many wooden summer houses were built by people from Stockholm.

It was not until 1912 that it allowed houses to be built from materials other than wood, giving the town a distinctive appearance.

Transportation
Vaxholm is situated on an island, but is linked to the Swedish mainland by a series of road bridges, and a bus service connects the town to Stockholm city. The Waxholmsbolaget and other ferry lines also provide boat services to central Stockholm and many of the other islands of the Stockholm archipelago.

The Kastellet ferry, an electrically powered cable ferry provides passenger access to Vaxholm Castle on its islet in the middle of the Kodjupet.

Sports
The following sports clubs are located in Vaxholm :
 IFK Vaxholm
 Vaxholms IBF
 Vaxholms TK
 IK Waxholm
 Waxholms KK

Gallery

References

External links

Locality of Vaxholm  - Official site
A Day out to Vaxholm from Stockholm - Travel Magazine, 2013

Stockholm archipelago
Metropolitan Stockholm
Municipal seats of Stockholm County
Swedish municipal seats
Populated places in Vaxholm Municipality
Coastal cities and towns in Sweden
Populated places established in 1558

fi:Vaxholmin kunta